During the 1997–98 English football season, Crystal Palace competed in the FA Premier League.

Season summary
Experienced Italian midfielder Attilio Lombardo was one of the most famous names to wear a Palace shirt when he arrived at Selhurst Park early in the season, and his influential form looked to have secured Palace's top flight status as they stood 10th as late as November. Within the first 14 games of the season, they were enjoying reasonable mid-table form, losing and winning five each and drawing four games; all of their wins at the time were away from home. Their 1–0 win at Tottenham Hotspur cumulated their good form though and from then on, they would struggle. Lombardo's fellow countryman Michele Padovano was also signed, but proved to be a complete flop, as did Swedish forward Tomas Brolin, and Palace were soon deep in relegation trouble.

With a takeover by computer tycoon Mark Goldberg on the horizon, Steve Coppell relinquished his managerial duties to become Director of Football. Lombardo and Brolin became joint player-managers on a short-term contract, but were unable to stave off relegation, which was confirmed on 27 April after a 3–0 defeat to Manchester United and they were soon on their way out of the club and Ray Lewington was appointed for the final three league games of the season. It was a season to forget for the club which saw them win just two home league games all season and it took them a staggering eight months to record their first home league win: against Derby County in April.

When the Goldberg takeover was completed, Terry Venables returned to the manager's seat after an eventful 18 years away, with the new chairman boasting that Palace would be a European force by 2003.

Kit
Palace retained the previous season's home kit, manufactured by German company Adidas and sponsored by TDK.

Final league table

Results summary

Results by round

Results
Crystal Palace's score comes first

Legend

FA Premier League

FA Cup

League Cup

First-team squad
Squad at end of season

Left club during season

Reserve squad

Transfers

In

Out

Transfers in:  £14,100,000
Transfers out:  £7,075,000
Total spending:  £7,025,000

Statistics

Appearances and goals

|-
! colspan=14 style=background:#dcdcdc; text-align:center| Goalkeepers

|-
! colspan=14 style=background:#dcdcdc; text-align:center| Defenders

|-
! colspan=14 style=background:#dcdcdc; text-align:center| Midfielders

|-
! colspan=14 style=background:#dcdcdc; text-align:center| Forwards

|-
! colspan=14 style=background:#dcdcdc; text-align:center| Players transferred out during the season

Notes

References

Crystal Palace F.C. seasons
Crystal Palace